The National Governors Conference (Spanish: Conferencia Nacional de Gobernadores) is a non-governmental organization in Mexico that consists of the governors of the states of Mexico. The organization, known by the acronym CONAGO, was established in 2001 with a meeting of 20 governors in Mazatlan. The following year, 2002, marked the first meeting of CONAGO at which the governors of all 31 states attended.

Governors of ten states left the CONAGO on September 7, 2020. The governors all belong to the Alianza Federalista (Federalist Alliance) and they have criticized the government's responses to the health and economic responses to the COVID-19 pandemic in Mexico. The governors involved are Javier Corral Jurado (CHH , chairman), José Rosas Aispuro (DUR ), Enrique Alfaro Ramírez (JAL, Independent), Silvano Aureoles Conejo (MIC ), Francisco Javier García Cabeza de Vaca (TAM), José Ignacio Peralta (COL ), Miguel Ángel Riquelme Solís (COA ), Jaime Rodríguez Calderón (NLE, Independent), Diego Sinhué Rodríguez Vallejo (GUA , and Martín Orozco Sandoval (AGU ).

See also
 List of current state governors in Mexico
 National Governors Association, a similar organization in the United States
Abbreviations of states in Mexico

References

External links
 official website
Politics of Mexico
Organizations established in 2001
2001 establishments in Mexico